Lathrop is a city located  south of Stockton in San Joaquin County, California, United States. The 2022 California Census reported that Lathrop's population was 30,659. The city is located in the San Joaquin Valley in Northern California at the intersection of Interstate 5 and California State Route 120.

History
Lathrop was platted when the transcontinental railroad was extended to that point around 1868. A post office has been in operation at Lathrop since 1871. The city was named for Jane Stanford, née Lathrop, wife of Leland Stanford.

On September 6, 1869, four months after the golden spike ceremony of the first transcontinental railroad at Promontory Summit, the San Joaquin Railroad Bridge at Mossdale Crossing at Lathrop was finished by Western Pacific. This actually completed the last link of the transcontinental railroad to the Pacific coast with the first through train from Sacramento arriving that evening at the Alameda Wharf in San Francisco Bay.

On August 14, 1889, former Chief Justice of California David S. Terry assaulted United States Supreme Court Justice Stephen J. Field, at the train station in Lathrop. Field's bodyguard, United States Marshal David Neagle (formerly assigned to Tombstone, Arizona), shot and killed Terry. The events led to the United States Supreme Court decision In re Neagle, which granted immunity from state prosecution to federal officers acting within the scope of their federal authority.

Geography
Lathrop is located at  (37.816904, -121.288633). The San Joaquin River is on the west side of Lathrop and has elevation of 20 feet (7 m).

Neighboring cities and towns include Stockton, Manteca, Ripon, French Camp, and Tracy.

Government

The mayor of Lathrop is Sonny Dhaliwal. The current city council consists of Mayor Dhaliwal, Vice-Mayor Diane Lazard, Councilmember Jennifer Torres-O'Callaghan, Councilmember Paul Akinjo, and Councilmember Minnie Diallo.

Lathrop is represented in the California State Assembly by Assemblymember  and California State Senator Susan Talamantes Eggman.

Public transportation
The City of Lathrop is served by the San Joaquin Regional Transit District and the Altamont Corridor Express  commuter rail train at Lathrop/Manteca station.

Demographics

The 2010 United States Census reported that Lathrop had a population of 18,023. The racial makeup of Lathrop was 7,410 (41.1%) White, 1,300 (7.2%) African American, 231 (1.3%) Native American, 3,968 (22.0%) Asian (mostly Filipino), 144 (0.8%) Pacific Islander, 3,735 (20.7%) from other races, and 1,235 (6.9%) from two or more races. Hispanics or Latinos of any race were 7,674 persons (42.6%).

The census reported that 18,011 people (99.9% of the population) lived in households, 6 (<0.1%) lived in noninstitutionalized group quarters, and 6 (<0.1%) were institutionalized.

Of the 4,782 households, 2,738 (57.3%) had children under 18 living in them, 2,973 (62.2%) were opposite-sex married couples living together, 719 (15.0%) had a female householder with no husband present, 379 (7.9%) had a male householder with no wife present; 376 (7.9%) were unmarried opposite-sex partnerships, and 35 (0.7%) same-sex married couples or partnerships. About 10.1% of households were made up of individuals, and 2.7% had someone living alone who was 65 or older. The average household size was 3.77. The average family size was 3.99.

The age distribution was 5,819 people (32.3%) under 18, 1,814 people (10.1%) 18 to 24, 5,324 people (29.5%) 25 to 44, 3,897 people (21.6%) 45 to 64, and 1,169 people (6.5%) who were 65 or older. The median age was 30.5 years. For every 100 females, there were 99.7 males. For every 100 females 18 and over, there were 97.7 males.

The homeowner vacancy rate was 3.7%; the rental vacancy rate was 5.5%, and 13,191 people (73.2% of the population) lived in owner-occupied housing units with 4,820 people (26.7%) in rental housing units.

Sister city
Lathrop participates in the Sister City program and is tied to Bacarra, Ilocos Norte, Philippines.

Economy

According to the City's 2020 Comprehensive Annual Financial Report, the top 10 employers in the city are:

Economic potential

The City of Lathrop has a seven-mile (11 km) radius population of 105,893 with an average household income of $63,072.

Lathrop is centered between the Stockton and Tracy submarkets – both  within a  radius.

In April 2014, electric car maker Tesla Motors (based in Palo Alto, about an hour southwest) announced that it would be opening a factory in Lathrop, in a  facility that was once a DaimlerChrysler distribution center.  The Tesla website showed 34 positions it was looking to fill to start.

Lathrop large development 

Mossdale Village, located west of I-5 and east of the San Joaquin River, consists of 2375 units and is of unique historical significance. The development abuts, and is named after, the site of the San Joaquin Railroad Bridge at Mossdale crossing, which was the final link to the Pacific coast for the Transcontinental Railroad, actually completed on September 6, 1869, four months after the official celebration and driving of the golden spike at Promontory Utah. California State Historical Marker number 781-7 is at Mossdale Crossing Park.

Education 
Manteca Unified School District serves the City of Lathrop with the exception of the River Islands development on the west side of Interstate 5, which is served by Public Charter Schools under Banta Unified School District.

Elementary schools
Manteca Unified School District serves the Lathrop community with three elementary schools, Joseph Widmer Jr, Lathrop School, and Mossdale School. Residents of the River Islands development are served by three public chartered elementary schools under Banta Unified School District.

High schools
Lathrop High School, under Manteca Unified School District, was the first secondary school in Lathrop; it opened in 2008. Lathrop High, the home of the Spartans, has  the Spartan band, consisting of concert band, Symphonic band, marching band, and drum line, performs at Cal Band Day at Cal Berkeley. A second High School in the River Islands Development opened in 2022 under Banta Unified School District.

References

External links

 

 
Cities in San Joaquin County, California
Incorporated cities and towns in California
First transcontinental railroad